Acantholycosa dudkoromani is a species of wolf spider only known from high in the south-eastern Altai Mountains in Russia.

This spider is around 9 mm in length. It is dark brown with a black head and yellow-brown spots on the upper legs. It is very similar to Acantholycosa dudkorum and they may be conspecific.

References

Lycosidae
Spiders described in 2003
Spiders of Russia